"Misery" is a song performed by the Minneapolis rock band Soul Asylum, released as a single in 1995. Although Let Your Dim Light Shine critically suffered in comparison to its predecessor, Grave Dancers Union, the single, "Misery", reached number 20 on The Billboard Hot 100 and number one on the Modern Rock Tracks chart in the US. The song featured prominently in Kevin Smith's 2006 movie Clerks II and on an episode of the TV show Hindsight.  It was also parodied by "Weird Al" Yankovic as "Syndicated Inc." on his album Bad Hair Day. The B-side on the single is "Hope", a cover song from the Descendents' first album Milo Goes to College (1982).

Music video
The music video for "Misery" features footage of the band performing onstage intercut with film of what appears to be the making of the "Misery" CD single itself.

Track listing

Standard edition
 "Misery" – 4:24
 "Hope" (The Descendents) – 2:05

Limited edition
 "Misery" – 4:24
 "Hope" (The Descendents) – 2:05
 "Fearless Leader"
 "You'll Live for Now"
 "Summer of Drugs" (Victoria Williams)

Charts

Weekly charts

Year-end charts

See also
Number one modern rock hits of 1995
List of RPM Rock/Alternative number-one singles (Canada)

References

External links

1995 singles
Soul Asylum songs
Song recordings produced by Butch Vig
Songs written by Dave Pirner